Saint Margaret's is a civil parish and townland in the historical barony of Coolock in Dublin, Ireland. Rivermeade, a housing estate of 175 homes which is treated as a separate census town, is located between Saint Margaret's and the Ward River. Dublin Airport is also nearby.

History
One of the earliest documented references to St. Margaret's dates to 1182, when Pope Lucius III reportedly confirmed "the town of St. Margarets" to the Archbishop of Dublin. Other evidence of ancient settlement in the area includes a fulacht fiadh site, holy well, and an early 18th century church and graveyard.

Also nearby is the 15th century Dunsoghly Castle, the one-time residence of John Plunket, who was Lord Chief Justice of Ireland from 1559 until his death in 1582. The graveyard and well at St. Margaret's are also historically associated with the Plunket family and it was reputedly a member of this family who had "St. Margaret's Spa Well [..] walled in so as to form a bath 6 feet long by 3 feet wide".

Geography
There are 14 townlands within Saint Margaret's civil parish, including Barberstown, Harristown, Newtown, Sandyhill, Shanganhill, and Saint Margaret's. A number of these townlands, such as Shanganhill, overlap with the grounds of Dublin Airport.

Rivermeade, a housing development of 175 homes south of the Ward River, is also located in the area. For census purposes, Rivermeade is treated as a census town and had a population of 530 people as of the 2016 census. It is served by Dublin Bus route 40B.

In 2018, the local authority, Fingal County Council, published a statutory Local Area Plan (LAP) covering the area. The LAP envisaged making Rivermeade, and St. Margaret's in general, a "more viable community" and providing a base for local services, with allowance for the addition of up to 275 houses, a commercial centre and a civic space.

Amenities
Local national (primary) schools include St. Margaret's National School (with an enrollment of approximately 90 pupils), and Mary Queen of Ireland National School in Rivermeade (which opened in 1981).

The local Roman Catholic church, which is dedicated to Saint Margaret, is a 'chapel of ease' in Finglas parish in the Archdiocese of Dublin.

Sport
Sports clubs in the area include St Margaret's GAA club (which was founded in 1908) and St. Margaret's Golf Club. As of 2018, Rivermeade F.C. was fielding association football (soccer) teams in the Athletic Union League.

References

Civil parishes of County Dublin
Townlands of County Dublin